This is a list of mayors of the 50 largest cities in Spain, are ordered the estimated populations as of 2022. These 50 cities have a combined population of 17.5 million, or 37% of the national population.

The breakdown of mayoral political parties is 27 from the Spanish Socialist Workers' Party, 13 from the People's Party and 10 from local or regional political parties.

List

See also 

 List of Spanish cities by population
 Mayoralty in Spain
 Spanish Federation of Municipalities and Provinces

References 

Cities